Revolution of 1974 may refer to:

The Ethiopian Revolution against Haille Selassie
The Carnation Revolution in Portugal